Cochineal Red may refer to:
the red pigment carmine
Cochineal Red A, a synthetic colourant known as Ponceau 4R
Cochineal Red: travels through ancient Peru, 2006 travel book by Hugh Thomson